The 2015–16 Illinois State Redbirds men's basketball team represented Illinois State University during the 2015–16 NCAA Division I men's basketball season. The Redbirds, led by fourth-year head coach Dan Muller, played their home games at Redbird Arena in Normal, Illinois as a member of the Missouri Valley Conference. They finished the season 18–14, 12–6 in conference play, to finish in a tie for second place. As the number three seed in the MVC tournament, they were defeated by Indiana State in their quarterfinal game.

Previous season 
The Redbirds finished the 2014–15 season 22–13, 11–7 in conference play, to finish in a tie for third place. For the Missouri Valley tournament they were the number four seed, defeating Evansville in a quarterfinal game and eighth ranked Wichita State in a semifinal game before succumbing to eleventh ranked Northern Iowa in the final. They received an at-large bid to the National Invitation Tournament where they won over Green Bay in the first round before losing to Old Dominion in the second round.

Offseason

Departures

Arrivals

Transfers

Recruiting Class

Roster

Schedule and results

|-
!colspan=9 style=|Exhibition Season

|-
!colspan=9 style=|Non-Conference Regular Season

|-
!colspan=9 style=|Missouri Valley Conference Regular Season

|-
!colspan=9 style=|State FarmMissouri Valley Conference {MVC} tournament
|-

|-

Source

References

Illinois State Redbirds men's basketball seasons
Illinois State Redbirds men's basketball
Illinois State Redbirds men's basketball
Illinois State Redbirds